Marcolino Neto Silva Lima de Sá (born 17 May 1996), commonly known as Marcolino or Neto Marcolino, is a Brazilian professional footballer who plays as a midfielder for Greek Super League 2 club Levadiakos.

Career statistics

Club

Notes

References

1996 births
Living people
Brazilian footballers
Brazilian expatriate footballers
Association football midfielders
Guarani FC players
Apollon Larissa F.C. players
Brazilian expatriate sportspeople in Greece
Expatriate footballers in Greece